The Hellenic Physical Society is a not-for-profit membership organization of professionals in physics and related disciplines. Its mission is to develop scientific research, pedagogy, and professional code of conduct in Physical Sciences, in Greece and abroad. Since January 1970, the Hellenic Physical Society (ΕΕΦ) is a member of the European Physical Society

History 
The Hellenic Physical Society was founded in 1930, in Athens, where it is headquartered. According to a report by Europhysics News, ΕΕΦ had 1,050 members in 1974., while in 2020, its members were 3,054

Activities 
The Hellenic Physical Society is active in research and pedagogy in physics, by organizing conferences, seminars, outreach events, and by publishing physics-related educational and scientific publications, such as conference proceedings. The Society participates in various international networks of scientific associations, such as the European Physical Society and the Balkan Physical Union, and seeks to further expand communication and international cooperation in physics. The Society offers awards to distinguished physicists for their contribution to education and science, such as Giorgos Grammatikakis, and Stamatios Krimigis. ΕΕΦ is also involved with the advancement of teaching physics in secondary education.

References

External links 
 Official website

Physics societies